Adventure in Paradise or Tian tang qi yu  is a 1970 Hong Kong adventure film directed by Jingbo Chen.

Cast
Henry Fong
Ming Jiang
Shek Lui
Hua Xiang

External links
 

1970 films
1970s adventure films
1970s Mandarin-language films
Hong Kong adventure films
1970s Hong Kong films